There have been numerous reports of chemical weapons attacks in the Syrian Civil War, beginning in 2012, and corroborated by national governments, the United Nations (UN), the Organisation for the Prohibition of Chemical Weapons (OPCW), Human Rights Watch (HRW), and media organizations. The attacks occurred in different areas of Syria, including Khan al-Assal, Jobar, Saraqib, Ashrafiyat Sahnaya, Kafr Zita, Talmenes, Sarmin and Douma. The deadliest attacks were the August 2013 sarin attack in Ghouta (killing between 281 and 1,729 people), the April 2017 sarin attack in Khan Shaykhun (killing at least 89 people) and April 2018 Douma chemical attacks (killing 43 people and injuring 500 civilians). The most common agent used is chlorine (with one study finding it was used in 91.5% of attacks), with sarin and sulphur mustard also reported. Almost half of the attacks between 2014 and 2018 were delivered via aircraft and less than a quarter were delivered from the ground, with the remaining attacks having an undetermined method of delivery. Since the start of uprisings across Syria in 2011,Syrian Arab Armed Forces and pro-Assad paramilitary forces have been implicated in more than 300 chemical attacks in Syria.

Investigations have found that both the Syrian government of Bashar al-Assad and ISIL militants have used chemical weapons, with the majority of attacks being carried out by the Syrian government. In 2014, the OPCW Fact-Finding Mission in Syria concluded the use of chlorine was systematic and widespread. The following year, the OPCW-UN Joint Investigative Mechanism (OPCW-UN JIM) was established to identify the perpetrators of chemical attacks in Syria. The OPCW-UN JIM blamed the Syrian government of Bashar al-Assad for the sarin attack in Khan Shaykhun, as well as three chlorine attacks. They also concluded ISIL militants used sulphur mustard. According to the Independent International Commission of Inquiry on the Syrian Arab Republic, the Syrian government carried out 33 chemical attacks between 2013 and September 2018. A further six attacks were documented by the Commission, but the perpetrators were not sufficiently identified. According to HRW, 85 confirmed chemical attacks occurred between 21 August 2013 and 25 February 2018, and the Syrian government was responsible for the majority of the attacks. HRW said the actual number of attacks was likely higher than 85. According to a Global Public Policy Institute study, at least 336 attacks have occurred. The report said 98% of these attacks were carried out by Assad's forces and 2% by ISIL.

Attacks in 2013 prompted the international community to pressure the Syrian Armed Forces to agree to the supervised destruction of their chemical weapons. Despite the disarmament process, which completed on 23 June 2014, dozens of incidents with suspected use of chemical weapons followed throughout Syria, mainly blamed on Syrian Ba'athist forces, as well as ISIL, Syrian opposition forces, and Turkish Armed Forces. In April 2018, following at least 18 visits to Syria for inspections, the technical secretariat of the OPCW was unable to "verify that Syria had submitted a declaration that could be considered accurate and complete."

The Khan Shaykhun chemical attack on 4 April 2017 drew international condemnation, and resulted in U.S. military action against the Syrian government-controlled airbase at Shayrat. The Douma chemical attack on 7 April 2018 also drew a military response from the United States, United Kingdom and France. In April 2021, OPCW suspended Syria from its membership; critising the Assad regime for not revealing its chemical weapon stockpiles and contravening the Chemical Weapons Convention.

Background

At the outbreak of the Syrian Civil War in 2011 concerns were raised about both the security of Syria's chemical weapon sites and about the potential use of chemical weapons. In July 2012, Syrian Foreign Ministry spokesman Jihad Makdissi stated: "No chemical or biological weapons will ever be used... All of these types of weapons are in storage and under security and the direct supervision of the Syrian armed forces and will never be used unless Syria is exposed to external aggression."

A Syrian defector who worked inside the chemical weapons network alleged that in January 2012 two senior Syrian officers moved about 100 kg of chemical weapons materials from a secret military base in Nasiriyah. The Syrian source also described construction of special trucks, which could transport and mix the weapons. These mobile mixers were constructed inside Mercedes or Volvo trucks that were similar to refrigerator trucks. Inside were storage tanks, pipes and a motor to drive the mixing machinery, the defector said. On 23 July 2012, the Syrian government confirmed for the first time that it had chemical weapons, but stated that they would only be used in instances of external aggression.

On 20 August 2012, President Barack Obama used the phrase "red line" in reference to the use of chemical weapons. Specifically, Obama said: "We have been very clear to the Assad regime, but also to other players on the ground, that a red line for us is we start seeing a whole bunch of chemical weapons moving around or being utilized.  That would change my calculus.  That would change my equation."

In September 2012, the Syrian military began moving chemical weapons from Damascus to the port city of Tartus. That same month, it was reported that the military had restarted testing of chemical weapons at a base on the outskirts of Aleppo. On 28 September 2012, US Defence Secretary Leon Panetta said that the Syrian government had moved its chemical weapons in order to secure them from approaching opposition forces. It emerged that the Russian government had helped set up communications between the United States and Syria regarding the status of Syria's chemical weapons. Russian Foreign Minister Sergei Lavrov stated that Syria had given the United States "explanations" and "assurances" that it was taking care of the weapons. On 8 December, it was reported that members of the jihadist Al-Nusra Front had recently captured a Saudi-owned toxic chemicals plant outside of Aleppo. On 22 December 2012, Russian Foreign Minister Sergei Lavrov stated that Syria had consolidated chemical weapons into one or two places to prevent rebels capturing them, and that recent moves that had alarmed Western governments were part of this consolidation. Brigadier General Mustafa al-Sheikh, a Syrian army defector, confirmed that most of the chemical weapons have been transported to Alawite areas in Latakia and near the coast. Some chemical munitions remain in bases around Damascus. In December 2012 McClatchy reported various chemical weapons experts' skepticism that Syria was preparing to use chemical weapons, noting their "limited utility" in a civil war situation with fluid battlelines, and Syria's comments that such use would be "suicide" in view of US threats of retaliation.

On 6 September 2013 a bill was filed in the US Congress to authorize the use of military force against the Syrian military, mainly in response to the use of sarin in the Ghouta attack on 21 August 2013. On 9 September 2013, the U.S. Secretary of State John Kerry stated that the air strikes could be averted if Syria turned over "every single bit" of its chemical weapons stockpiles. Hours after Kerry's statement, the Russian foreign minister Sergey Lavrov announced that Russia had suggested to Syria that it relinquish its chemical weapons. The Syrian foreign minister Walid al-Moallem immediately welcomed the proposal.

In September 2013 the Syrian government entered into several international agreements for the destruction of its chemical weapons that stipulated an initial destruction deadline of 30 June 2014, a deadline apparently achieved in respect of declared chemical weapons. Prior to September 2013 the Syrian government had not publicly admitted to possessing chemical weapons, although Western intelligence services believed it to hold one of the world's largest stockpiles.

On 17 August 2017, Reuters published a report detailing the extent of Syria's failure to abandon chemical weapons, citing information from investigators, inspectors and diplomatic sources. According to a source cited in  the report, "There are certainly some gaps, uncertainties, discrepancies" regarding Syria's chemical weapons arsenal. For example, the Syrian government  inaccurately or even falsely declared the types, purposes and quantities of chemicals in its possession, and is suspected of continuing to hold at least 2,000 chemical bomb shells that should have been converted to conventional weapons.

Incidents

Investigation conducted by Dr. Tobias Schneider and Theresa Lutkefend of the GPPi research institute documented 336 confirmed attacks involving chemical weapons in Syria between 23 December 2012 and 18 January 2019. The study attributed 98% of the total chemical attacks to the Assad regime. Almost 90% of the attacks occurred after Ghouta chemical attack in August 2013.

Reported chemical weapons attacks
The table below lists the reported attacks and the main points. See the main articles for details.

Investigations

The UN mission to investigate alleged use of chemical weapons

The United Nations Mission to Investigate Allegations of the Use of Chemical Weapons in the Syrian Arab Republic was a fact-finding mission to investigate possible use of chemical weapons in Syria. On 16 September 2013 the mission published a report with focus on the Ghouta attacks. On 12 December 2013, the UN mission delivered its final report.

The UNHRC commission of inquiry

The Independent International Commission of Inquiry on the Syrian Arab Republic was set up by the United Nations Human Rights Council (UNHRC) on 22 March 2011 to investigate human rights violations during the Syrian civil war. In its report dated 12 February 2014 they confirmed the use of sarin in the case of Khan Al-Assal (19 March 2013), Saraqib (29 April 2013) and Al-Ghouta (21 August 2013). The UNHRC commission also found that the sarin used in the Khan al-Asal attack bore "the same unique hallmarks" as the sarin used in the Ghouta attack and indicated that the perpetrators likely had access to chemicals from the Syrian Army's stockpile.
In none of the incidents, however, was the commission's "evidentiary threshold" met in regards to identifying the perpetrators of the chemical attacks.

In its report dated 13 August 2014 they accused Government forces of using chlorine gas in 8 incidents in Idlib and Hama governorates in April 2014. In March 2017, the Commission documented conclusive evidence that Syrian aircraft dropped “toxic industrial chemicals, including chlorine,”  between 21 July and 22 December 22, during the final period of the Battle of Aleppo (2012–2016).

OPCW-UN Joint Mission in Syria

The OPCW-UN Joint Mission in Syria was established in October 2013. The Mission was tasked to oversee the elimination of the Syrian chemical weapons program. The first OPCW-UN team arrived in Damascus on 1 October 2013. The mission officially ended on 30 September 2014.

The Russian Khan al-Asal investigation

Vitaly Churkin, Russia's ambassador to the UN, said that its Syrian ally had asked Russian experts to look into the Khan al-Assal attack. A Russian team investigated the Khan al-Asal incident on 19 March 2013. The Russian UN ambassador Vitaly Churkin delivered a report with analysis of the samples taken at the site to the UN Secretary General Ban Ki-moon on 9 July 2013. Churkin said the chemical agent was carried by a "Bashair-3 unguided projectile", which was produced by the Basha'ir al-Nasr Brigade, a rebel group affiliated with the Free Syrian Army. However, following Churkin's announcement, Western governments said that they had yet to see any evidence that backs up the assertion that anyone besides the Assad regime had the ability to use chemical weapons. The Russian report was not released.

The OPCW Fact-Finding Mission in Syria

On 29 April 2014, the Director General Ahmet Üzümcü of the Organisation for the Prohibition of Chemical Weapons (OPCW) announced the creation of an OPCW mission to establish the facts surrounding allegations of the use of chlorine gas for hostile purposes in Syria. The Syrian Government has agreed to the mission.

On 27 May 2014, members of the mission were ambushed and briefly held by gunmen in rebel-held territory as it headed toward Kafr Zita to investigate the alleged chlorine gas attacks. According to the Associated Press, the OPCW said that the captive members of the mission were later "released after the intervention by Syria's main opposition group." The opposition Hama Media Centre said the attack on the convoy was carried out by President Bashar Assad's forces.

In its third report dated 18 December 2014, the mission concluded that chlorine was used in the villages of Talmenes, Al-Tamanah and Kafr Zita, but did not assign blame.

In early 2015 the mission disclosed previously undeclared traces of sarin and VX precursor compounds in a Syrian government military research site, the Scientific Studies and Research Centre, where use of those compounds had not been previously declared.

The UN-OPCW Joint Investigative Mechanism

On 7 August 2015, the United Nations Security Council adopted resolution 2235 (2015) to establish a joint investigation mechanism (JIM) to identify the perpetrators responsible for the use of chemical weapons in Syria. The resolution was drafted by the United States, and adopted by all 15 members of the Security Council. The JIM issued its first report on 12 February 2016. The second was released on 10 June 2016, while the third report was issued on 30 August 2016. The third report blamed the Syrian government for two gas attacks in 2015, and accused ISIS of using mustard gas. In October 2016 the leaked fourth report of task force determined that the Syria had conducted at least three gas attacks in 2015.

On 26 October 2017, the JIM delivered the report (37 pages) to the UN.

In late 2017, the JIM released its report on the April Khan Shaykhun chemical attack, attributing responsibility for the incident to the Syrian government.

Reuters reported in 2018 that, according to OPCW and diplomatic sources, an OPCW chemical marker analysis linked the destroyed stockpile samples to sarin samples from 21 August 2013 Ghouta attack and also to interviewees' samples from Khan Sheikhoun and Khan Al-Assal attack sites. These findings were not released because they were outside the OPCW's mandate.

The UN-OPCW Investigation and Identification Team
On 8 April 2020, the OPCW Investigation and Identification Team (IIT), set up in 2018, issued its first report, determining that the Syrian Air Force was the perpetrator of the chemical weapon attacks in Latamenah.

On 12 April 2021, the OPCW IIT released  second report, which concluded that there were reasonable grounds to believe that the Syrian Arab Air Force carried out a chlorine attack on eastern Saraqib on 4 February 2018. Findings of another OPCW investigation report published by the IIT in July 2021 revealed that the Syrian regime had engaged in confirmed chemical attacks atleast 17 times, out of the reported 77 chemical weapon attacks attributed to the regime's security forces. The third report published in 27 January 2023 by the OPCW-IIT concluded that the Assad regime was responsible for the 2018 Douma chemical attack which killed atleast 43 civilians and injured over 500.

Other allegations
In February 2012 a defector from the Syrian Arab Army, a lieutenant who worked in the chemical weapons department, told Turkish newspaper Hürriyet Daily News that "BZ-CS, Chlorine Benzilate, which damages people's nerves and makes them fade away, is being used in Bab Amr." He said that some Syrian soldiers had been supplied with gas masks for protection.

The factory produces chlorine among other chemicals. On 5 November 2014, the Syrian UN-ambassador Bashar al-Jaafari, said "terrorist organizations stole about 200 tons of [chlorine gas] from" the factory.

In January 2013, US State Department cables showed a US investigation had found evidence that the Syrian military had used a chemical weapon on 23 December 2012, which was the first time an official investigation documented chemical weapon use in the conflict. On 4 June, the French foreign minister Laurent Fabius similarly declared certainty that the Syrian government had used sarin on multiple instances.

On 30 May 2013, Turkish newspapers reported that Turkish security forces had arrested Al-Nusra Front fighters in the southern provinces of Mersin and Adana near the Syrian border and confiscated 2 kg of sarin gas. The Turkish Ambassador to Moscow later said that tests showed the chemical seized was not sarin, but anti-freeze. In September six of those arrested in May were charged with attempting to acquire chemicals which could be used to produce sarin; the indictment said that it was "possible to produce sarin gas by combining the materials in proper conditions."

On 1 June 2013, the Syrian Army reported that it seized two cylinders holding the nerve agent sarin in an area it said was controlled by opposition fighters. The Syrian government declared the two cylinders "as abandoned chemical weapons" and told the OPCW that "the items did not belong to" them. On 14 June 2014, the Joint OPCW-UN Mission confirmed that the cylinders contained sarin. On 7 July 2014, the U.N. Secretary-General Ban Ki-Moon informed the U.N. Security Council about the findings.

In September 2015 a US official stated that ISIS was manufacturing and using mustard agent in Syria and Iraq, and had an active chemical weapons research team. In February 2016, the CIA Director John O. Brennan said on 60 Minutes that there were "a number of instances where ISIL has used chemical munitions on the battlefield".

On 8 April 2016, a spokesman for the Jaysh al-Islam rebel group said that “weapons not authorized for use in these types of confrontations” had been used against Kurdish militia and civilians in Aleppo (160 killed or wounded). He stated that “One of our commanders has unlawfully used a type of weapon that is not included in our list”. He did not specify what substances were used but, according to Kurdish Red Crescent, the symptoms were consistent with the use of "chlorine gas or other agents". Jaysh al-Islam subsequently clarified that it was referring to “modified Grad rockets,” not chemical weapons.

On 4 May 2017, the BBC reported that, according to a Western intelligence agency, Syria was violating the 2013 disarmament deal by producing chemical and biological munitions at Masyaf, Dummar, and Barzeh.

On 27 June 2017, US officials stated that the Syrian government was preparing at a Syrian base for what seemed another chemical attack. The Trump administration warned that if another attack occurred, President Assad would pay a heavy price. This threat came as the intelligence community stated that the activity was similar to the preparations leading to the attack in Khan Sheikhoun.

Around 16 February 2018, the SOHR and the U.S.-backed Kurdish YPG stated that Turkey was suspected of conducting a chemical gas attack in Afrin. Syrian state news agency SANA, citing a doctor in a Afrin hospital, stated the shelling caused choking in six people.

In April 2018, Human Rights Watch published a report based on seven data sources, including the UN investigations, and was able to confirm 85 chemical attacks between 21 August 2013 and 25 February 2018, including more than 50 perpetrated by the government (including 42 using chlorine, 2 using sarin and 7 using unspecified chemicals) and three by ISIS (using sulphur mustard), with the remainder not attributed.

In October 2018, BBC Panorama and BBC Arabic investigated 164 reports of chemical attacks and were able to confirm 106 of them, 51 of which were certainly launched from the air and therefore could only have been perpetrated by the government or its allies.

In February 2019, the German thinktank Global Public Policy Institute (GPPi) published a report that “credibly substantiated” 336 uses of chemical weapons in the Syrian war, 98% of them by the government or allied forces (including several attributed to the Syrian Army's elite Tiger Forces) and the remainder by ISIL.

In May 2019, there were reports of a chemical attack on Kabana in Latakia.

See also
List of Syrian Civil War barrel bomb attacks
List of massacres during the Syrian Civil War
Use of chemical weapons in the Iraqi Civil War

Notes

Further reading
 
 Eliot Higgins Chemical munitions used by the Syrian government 2012-2018 Bellingcat June 14, 2018 
  Eliot Higgins What We Know About Hexamine and Syria's Sarin Bellingcat June 21, 2018

External links
 the logic of chemical weapons use in syria Report from Global Public Policy Institute (GPPi), a Berlin based think tank.

References